There are several classification systems for the economic evaluation of mineral deposits worldwide. The most commonly used schemes base on the International Reporting Template, developed by the CRIRSCO - Committee for Mineral Reserves International Reporting Standards, like the Australian Joint Ore Reserves Committee - JORC Code 2012, the Pan-European Reserves & Resources Reporting Committee' – PERC Reporting Standard from 2021, the Canadian Institute of Mining, Metallurgy and Petroleum - CIM classification and the South African Code for the Reporting of Mineral Resources and Mineral Reserves (SAMREC). A more detailed description of the historical development concerning reporting about mineral deposits can be found on the PERC web site.

Mineral resources
A 'Mineral Resource' is a concentration or occurrence of material of intrinsic economic interest in or on the earth's crust in such form, quality and quantity that there are reasonable prospects for eventual economic extraction. Mineral Resources are further sub-divided, in order of increasing geological confidence, into inferred, indicated and measured as categories.

Inferred Mineral Resource  is the part of a mineral resource for which quantity, grade (or quality) and mineral content can be estimated with a low level of confidence. It is inferred from geological evidence and assumed but not verified geological or grade continuity. It is based on information gathered through appropriate techniques from locations such as outcrops, trenches, pits, workings and drill holes which may be of limited or uncertain quality and it is also reliability.

Indicated resources are simply economic mineral occurrences that have been sampled (from locations such as outcrops, trenches, pits and drill holes) to a point where an estimate has been made, at a reasonable level of confidence, of their contained metal, grade, tonnage, shape, densities, physical characteristics.

Measured resources are indicated resources that have undergone enough further sampling that a 'competent person' (defined by the norms of the relevant mining code; usually a geologist) has declared them to be an acceptable estimate, at a high degree of confidence, of the grade (or quality), quantity, shape, densities, physical characteristics of the mineral occurrence.

The Canadian legislation (NI 43-101) concerning mineral projects within Canada appears to be similar to the CRIRSCO based reporting codes and standards.

Since 1998 an 'International Framework Classification for Reserves and Resources - Solid Fuels and Mineral Commodities' is in development by the United Nations Economic Commission for Europe (UN-ECE).

Generally, the classification of mineral deposits bases on an increasing level of geological/mineralogical knowledge about a mineral deposit. 

According to the CRIRSCO International Reporting Template mineral deposits are classified as Mineral Resources or Mineral Reserves.

Mineral reserves
A Mineral Reserve is the economically mineable part of a Measured Mineral Resource and/or Indicated Mineral Resource.

Mineral Reserves are subdivided in order of increasing confidence into Probable Mineral Reserves or Proved Mineral Reserves.

A Probable Mineral Reserve is the economically mineable part of an Indicated Mineral Resource, and in some circumstances, a Measured Mineral Resources. It includes diluting material and allowances for losses which may occur when the material is mined. A Probable Mineral Reserve has a lower level of confidence than a Proved Mineral Reserve but is of sufficient quality to serve as the basis for decision on the development of deposit.

A Proved Mineral Reserve is the economically mineable part of a Measured Mineral Resource. It includes diluting materials and allowances for losses which occur when the material is mined.

A Proved Mineral Reserve represents the highest confidence category of Mineral Reserve estimate. It implies a high degree of confidence in the geological factors and a high degree of confidence in the Modifying Factors. The style of mineralization or other factors could mean that Proved Mineral Reserves are not achievable in some deposits.

Generally the conversion of Mineral Resources into Mineral Reserves requires the application of various Modifying Factors, including, but not restricted to:
mining factors;
mineral processing / ore dressing related factors;
metallurgical factors;
infrastructure factors;
economic factors;
marketing factors;
legal factors;
ESG factors: Environmental, Social (including Health and Safety) and Governance

See also
 Economic geology
 Mineral economics
 Mineral exploration
 Ore genesis
 Ore
 PERC Reporting Standard 2021
 National Instrument 43-101
 United Nations Framework Classification for Resources

References

External links
 CRIRSCO - Committee for Mineral Reserves  International Reporting Standards
PERC Reporting Standard - Pan-European Standard for the Public Reporting of Exploration Results, Mineral Resources and Mineral Reserves
 JORC Code - The Australasian Code for Reporting of Exploration Results, Mineral Resources and Ore Reserves
 University of Western Australia Mining Law Centre
 U.S. Geological Survey Circular 831, Principles of a Resource/Reserve Classification for Minerals
 Canadian Institute of Mining, Metallurgy and Petroleum - CIM Definition Standards - On Mineral Resources and Mineral Reserves (PDF Format)
 The Canadian Council of Professional Geoscientists CCPG
 National Instrument (NI) 43-101 Standards for Disclosure of Mineral Properties (Canada)
 The South African SAMVAL, SAMREC and SAMOG Codes
 United Nations Framework Classification of Resources

Economic geology
Mineral economics